In mathematics, almost modules and almost rings are certain objects interpolating between  rings and their fields of fractions.

Almost modules
Let V be a local integral domain with the maximal ideal m, and K a fraction field of V. The category of K-modules, K-Mod, may be obtained as a quotient of V-Mod by the Serre subcategory of torsion modules, i.e. those N such that any element n in N is annihilated by some nonzero element in the maximal ideal. If the category of torsion modules is replaced by a smaller subcategory, we obtain an intermediate step between V-modules and K-modules. Faltings proposed to use the subcategory of almost zero modules, i.e. N ∈ V-Mod such that any element n in N is annihilated by all elements of the maximal ideal.

For this idea to work, m and V must satisfy certain technical conditions. Let V be a ring (not necessarily local) and m ⊆ V an idempotent ideal, i.e. an ideal such that m2 = m. Assume also that m ⊗ m is a flat V-module. A module N over V is almost zero with respect to such m if for all ε ∈ m and n ∈ N we have εn = 0. Almost zero modules form a Serre subcategory of the category of V-modules. The category of almost V-modules, Va-Mod, is a localization of V-Mod along this subcategory.

The assumptions on m guarantee that  is an exact functor which has both the right adjoint functor  and the left adjoint functor . Moreover,  is full and faithful. The category of almost modules is complete and cocomplete.

Almost rings 

The  tensor product of V-modules descends to a  monoidal structure on Va-Mod. An almost module R ∈ Va-Mod with a map R ⊗ R → R satisfying natural conditions, similar to a definition of a ring, is called an almost V-algebra or an almost ring if the context is unambiguous. Many standard properties of algebras and morphisms between them carry to the "almost" world.

Example

In the original paper by Faltings, V was the integral closure of a discrete valuation ring in the algebraic closure of its quotient field, and m its maximal ideal. Take m to be the maximal ideal of this ring. Then the quotient V/m is an almost zero module, while V/p is a torsion, but not almost zero module since the class of p1/p2 in the quotient is not annihilated by p1/p2 considered as an element of m.

References

 

Commutative algebra